Herbert Wallace Cragg (18 November 1910 – 27 July 1980) was an Anglican priest and author.

He was educated at St John's College, Durham and ordained in 1934. After curacies in Liverpool and Cheadle he held incumbencies in Blackburn, Carlisle and Beckenham He was Archdeacon of Bromley from 1969 to 1978.

References

1910 births
Alumni of St John's College, Durham
Archdeacons of Bromley
1980 deaths